Michel Leblanc is a Canadian entrepreneur responsible for starting up seven airlines in 20 years, including Royal Aviation (sold to Canada 3000 in 2001 and bankrupt soon after) and Jetsgo (20022005).

References

Year of birth missing (living people)
Living people
Canadian businesspeople